Halley is a 2012 Mexican horror film directed by Sebastián Hofmann and produced by Julio Chavezmontes and Jaime Romandia. It premiered at the 2012 Morelia International Film Festival, and later showed at the 2013 Sundance Film Festival and was part of the Hivos Tiger Awards Competition of the IFF Rotterdam.

The film follows Alberto, a night guard with a decomposing body who decides to withdraw from the world.

Plot

Alberto is dead and can no longer hide it. Make-up and perfume can no longer conceal his quickly decomposing body. Dismayed, he decides to withdraw from the world. But before surrendering to his living death, Alberto forms an unusual friendship with Luly, the manager of the 24-hour gym where he works as a night guard.

Cast
 Alberto Trujillo as Alberto
 Lourdes Trueba as Luly
 Hugo Albores as morgue worker

Production

Themes 
About the name of the movie, the director Sebastián Hofmann said in an interview with Vice Mexico that when he started thinking about the story for his film, he had a childhood memory of his grandmother asking him to draw Halley's Comet. That happened in 1986, the last time it passed around the Earth. While writing the script for the film in Yucatán, México, he was walking across a town when he saw a newspaper where he read that there was going to be a meteor shower caused by the cosmic dust trail of Halley's Comet. He thought then that it was too much of a coincidence and called the project like the comet. For the director, Halley is also "a symbol for immortality" since it has been known since the beginnings of astronomy and orbits around the Sun every 75 years. Hofmann says "it is the eternal witness of our history, with its cycles of upswing and decline. The space between each one of its visits is the duration of a human life."

Release
The film premiered at the Morelia International Film Festival in November 2012 and later showed at the 2013 Sundance Film Festival. The film was also screened in the International Film Festival Rotterdam, on January 25, 2013.

Critical reception
For its special treatment of topics as mortality, illness and loneliness, the cinematography and the protagonist performance, Halley gained positive reviews in several media. Marc Saint-Cyr of Senses of Cinema praised the film for taking the zombie genre into an original territory with a "thoughtful, expertly composed character study". He concluded that "while so many other filmmakers claim they want to bend or break free from overdone zombie movie conventions, Hofmann fearlessly leaves them all behind and emerges with a hauntingly relatable examination of the body, mortality and alienation. Precise and pure, it is a virtually flawless artistic achievement". Mark Adams from Screen Daily called the movie "a disturbingly stylish and surrealistic drama", with a "strangely compelling story, impressive performances and strange sense of the grotesque".

Accolades

References

External links
 

Mexican horror films
2012 films
2010s Mexican films